Abgar Barsom (born 4 September 1977) is a Swedish former professional footballer who played as a midfielder.

Club career 
He made his first spell at Djurgårdens IF from 2000 to 2002, after having joined Djurgårdens IF from BK Forward. He was later sold to SC Heerenveen in the Netherlands, but his time at the Abe Lenstra Stadion was no success. Consequently, Barsom returned to Sweden and Djurgårdens IF at the start of the 2004 season. He has won the Swedish championship twice, in 2002 and 2005. After the 2006 season, Barsom announced that he was looking for a new challenge in another club. He signed a six-month contract with Greek club Messiniakos in the Greek second division. When his contract with Messiniakos ran out he signed for Allsvenskan team Örebro SK. After saving the club from relegation and the contract with Örebro SK had expired, he joined Norwegian club Fredrikstad FK. He finished his career in Syrianska FC.

International career 
Barsom appeared five times for the Sweden U17 team in 1993.

Personal life 
Barsom is of Aramean-Swedish descent.

Honours 
 Djurgårdens IF
 Allsvenskan: 2002, 2005
 Superettan : 2000
 Svenska Cupen: 2002, 2004, 2005

Individual 
 Allsvenskan Player of the Month: June 2001
 Swedish Newcomer of the Year: 2001

References

External links
 
 
 

1977 births
Örebro SK players
SC Heerenveen players
Djurgårdens IF Fotboll players
Fredrikstad FK players
Syrianska FC players
Swedish footballers
Swedish people of Assyrian/Syriac descent
Association football midfielders
Living people
Expatriate footballers in Norway
Swedish expatriate sportspeople in Norway
Expatriate footballers in the Netherlands
Swedish expatriate sportspeople in the Netherlands
Swedish expatriate footballers
Allsvenskan players
Superettan players
Eredivisie players
Eliteserien players
Christian Democrats (Sweden) politicians
BK Forward players
Assyrian footballers